() is a municipality and village in Frýdek-Místek District in the Moravian-Silesian Region of the Czech Republic. It has about 600 inhabitants.

Polish minority makes up 10.1% of the population.

Etymology
The name literally means "river".

Geography

Řeka lies in the historical region of Cieszyn Silesia in the Moravian-Silesian Beskids mountain range. The Ropičanka stream flows through the municipality.

History
Řeka was founded in 1644 was formed by the separation from Smilovice and Guty, and originally named Řeka smilovská. It belonged then to the Duchy of Teschen. The village was established as a typical mountain settlement by associating already existing scattered mountain pastures and mountain farms. In the following years, other small farmers settled in the newly formed village. The main source of livelihood of the inhabitants was mountain farming.

After Revolutions of 1848 in the Austrian Empire a modern municipal division was introduced in the re-established Austrian Silesia. The village as a municipality was subscribed to the political and legal district of Cieszyn. According to the censuses conducted in 1880–1910 the population of the municipality dropped from 524 in 1880 to 515 in 1910 with a majority being native Polish-speakers (between 95.5% and 99.6%) accompanied by a small German-speaking minority (at most 19 or 4.1% in 1890) and Czech-speaking people (growing from 1 in 1880 to 10 in 1910). In terms of religion in 1910 the majority were Protestants (92.6%), followed by Roman Catholics (6.8%) and 3 people adhering to another faiths (but not Jewish).

After World War I, Polish–Czechoslovak War and the division of Cieszyn Silesia in 1920, it became a part of Czechoslovakia. Following the Munich Agreement, in October 1938 together with the Zaolzie region it was annexed by Poland, administratively adjoined to Cieszyn County of Silesian Voivodeship. It was then annexed by Nazi Germany at the beginning of World War II. After the war it was restored to Czechoslovakia.

Sport
There is a small ski resort in the municipality.

Sights
Řeka is poor in historic monuments. There are two valuable wooden folk houses.

References

External links

 

Villages in Frýdek-Místek District
Cieszyn Silesia